The Maragtas is a work by Pedro Alcantara Monteclaro titled (in English translation) History of Panay from the first inhabitants and the Bornean immigrants, from which they descended, to the arrival of the Spaniards. The work is in mixed Hiligaynon and Kinaray-a languages in Iloilo in 1907. It is an original work based on written and oral sources available to the author.

Nonetheless, whether the work is purely fictional has been debated.

Content
The Maragtas is an original work which purports to be based on written and oral sources of which no copy has survived. The author makes no claim that the work contains a transcription of particular pre-Hispanic documents. The work consists of a publisher's introduction by Salvador Laguda, a foreword by the author, six chapters, and an epilogue. 

The first chapter describes the former customs, clothes, dialect, heredity, organization, etc. of the Aetas of Panay, with special mention of Marikudo, son of old Chief Polpulan; the second chapter begins a narrative of the ten Datus flight from Borneo and the tyranny of Rajah Makatunaw there, to the island of Panay. The datus bartered with a local Ati chieftain Marikudo for the plains and valleys of the island, offering gold in return. One datu, Paiburong, was given the territory of Irong-Irong, which is now the province of Iloilo in the Philippines; the third chapter tells of the romance of Sumakwel, Kapinangan and her lover Gurung-garung; the fourth chapter concludes the tale of the ten datus, telling about their political arrangements and their circumnavigation of the island; the fifth chapter describes language, commerce, clothing, customs, marriages, funerals, mourning habits, cockfighting, timekeeping techniques, calendars, and personal characteristics; the sixth and final chapter gives a list of Spanish officials between 1637 and 1808; the epilog contains a few eighteenth-century dates.

Use by historians
Philippine historians made little use of the Maragtas before the Japanese occupation, with references such as that by Josué Soncuya in his 1917 Historia Pre-Hispanica de Filipinas having been restricted to the Spanish-speaking elite.  In a book published in 1984, the historian William Henry Scott wrote in reference to an interesting research related to Maragtas. Scott said that in 1947, a book co-authored by historian H. Otley Beyer, founder of the Anthropology Department of the University of the Philippines, refers to Margitas and "the ancient writing in which it was originally inscribed. Scott quoted Beyer stating: A remarkable document known as 'Margitas', dating probably from about 1225, was preserved in Panay and transliterated into romanized Visayan in early Spanish days." The myth that the Maragtas was not an original work but rather a transcription of earlier works was later given wider circulation by various academics, as detailed by Scott.  Scott concludes that the Maragtas was an original work by Pedro Alcantara Monteclaro.

Other Philippine historians, however, have other opinions. Their research led to an interesting theory that some of the data in the Maragtas is verifiable in other sources.

In the year 2000, the Filipino anthropologist F. Landa Jocano, on his part wrote a quite different account about the findings of H. Otley Beyer. Jocano maintains that the manuscript that Beyer was referring to as "A remarkable document" was in fact the Maragtas, not the Margitas. According to Beyer, the original text of the Maragtas was written in old syllabary, although the document was preserved in Romanized Bisayan in early Spanish days. Beyer claimed that the Maragtas written in original syllabary "was brought to Spain in the early 19th century by a Spanish colonel, but it can no longer be traced". On the other hand, the American Anthropologist seemed also sure in his description of the text, and he described it as follows:

Early Spanish explorer Miguel de Loarca wrote in his report titled Relacion de las Yslas Filipinas in June 1582, writing in Arevalo (Panay):

In 1582, Loarca was not cognizant of any writing system used by the natives of Panay. Yet, at the later part of the Spanish colonization, it was discovered that various forms of ancient Filipino writing system were existing, including those used in the Visayas.  The Archives of the University of Santo Tomas in Manila, which contains the biggest collection of ancient documents in this writing system guarantees the proof of this.

Scott himself had no doubt regarding the historicity of an event that led to the transmission of an oral tradition that came to be known as the "Maragtas". He said in the revised version of his doctoral dissertation, published in 1984:

Anthropologist Patricia P. Magos asserts,

The text contains native language names of old settlements in Panay which were later hispanized and lists of stream and river deltas where the Malay settlers established coastal villages and cultivated with seeds of plants brought with them from the southern islands.

This oral legend of ancient Hiligaynons rebelling against Rajah Makatunao as written in the Maragtas have corroboration in Chinese records during the Song Dyanasty when Chinese scholars recorded that the ruler during a February 1082 AD diplomatic meeting, was Seri Maharaja, and his descendant was Rajah Makatunaw and was together with Sang Aji (grandfather to Sultan Muhammad Shah). Madja-as could have an even earlier history since Robert Nicholl stated that a Bruneian (Vijayapuran) and Madjas (Mayd) alliance had existed against China as early as the 800s. Historian Robert Nicholl implied that the Srivijayans of Sumatra, Vijayans of Vijayapura at Brunei and the Visayans in the Philippines were all related and connected to each other since they form one contiguous area.

The notion that the Maragtas is an original work of fiction by Monteclaro is disputed by a 2019 Thesis, named "Mga Maragtas ng Panay:
Comparative Analysis of Documents about the Bornean Settlement Tradition" by Talaguit Christian Jeo N. of De La Salle University who stated that, "Contrary to popular belief, the Monteclaro Maragtas is not a primary source of the legend but is rather more accurately a secondary source at best" as the story of the Maragtas also appeared in the Augustinian Friar, Rev. Fr. Tomas Santaren’s Bisayan Accounts of Early Bornean Settlements (originally a part of the appendice in the book, Igorrotes: estudio geográfico y etnográfico sobre algunos distritos del norte de Luzon Igorots: a geographic and ethnographic study of certain districts of northern Luzon by Fr. Angel Perez) Additionally, the characters and places mentioned in the Maragtas book, like Rajah Makatunaw and Madj-as can be found in Ming Dynasty Annals and Arabic Manuscripts. However, the written dates go earlier since Rajah Makatunaw was recorded to have been from 1082 AD as he was a descendant of Seri Maharaja in Chinese texts, while the Maragtas book placed him at the 1200s. As an elaboration, the scholar, J. Carrol in his article: "The Word Bisaya in the Philippines and Borneo" (1960) thinks there might be indirect evidence in the possible affinity between the Visayans and Melanaos as he speculates that Makatunao is similar with the ancient leader of the Melanao called "Tugao".

Use by artists
Despite the controversy on The Maragtas, it has definitely enriched the arts scene. Based on it, Ricaredo Demetillo wrote Barter in Panay, which won the UP Golden Jubilee Award for Poetry in 1958. He later extracted from it the verse tragedy The Heart of Emptiness is Black, which won the Palanca Award in 1973, and produced by the UP Repertory Company and directed by noted stage director Behn Cervantes in June 1974.

Jeremias Elizalde Navarro (J. Elizalde Navarro), who is from San Jose, Antique, immortalized a scene from Maragtas with two versions of the mural Bulawan nga Saduk, one of which could be viewed at the lobby of the Antique Provincial Capitol, and the other in the collection of an insurance company. Demetillo's play was later adapted by playwright Orlando Nadres as "Kapinangan," a drama musical presented at the Manila Metropolitan Theater in 1981. It was directed by Cervantes, with music by Ryan Cayabyab, and starred Kuh Ledesma as Kapinangan, Robert Arevalo as Datu Sumakwel, and Hajji Alejandro as Gurong-gurong.

Almost all the major writers in Panay, including Magdalena Jalandoni, Ramon Muzones, and Conrado Norada have written adaptations of the legend in the novel form. From the Maragtas, Alex C. Delos Santos wrote the one-act play Pagtimalus ni Kapinangan (Kapaningan's Revenge), based on the chapter on Kapinangan's adulterous relationship. Delos Santos, however, rethinks the story and views it from Kapinangan's point of view, suggesting that the act was deliberate on Kapinangan's part because she felt that Sumakwel was so engrossed with his obligations as chieftain, forgetting Kapinangan and their marriage. The play was presented in 2002 at St. Anthony's College, and as part of the trilogy "Tres Mujeres" presented at Iloilo National High School as part of the Duag Teatrokon Regional Theater Festival.

In music and theater, Rolando Tinio, Jose Lardizabal, and National Artist for Music Lucrecia Kasilag produced Dulawaran: Ang Gintong Salakot in 1969 for the inauguration of the Cultural Center of the Philippines.

In dance, Ballet Philippines produced Kapinangan choreography and Libretto by Eddie Elejar, and music by Lucrecia Kasilag at the Cultural Center of the Philippines. US-based dancer/choreographer Dulce Capadocia also used the Kapinangan strand of the Maragtas in her multi-media dance epic Ma'I Lost, which premiered at the Luckman Fine Arts Complex in 1999.

See also
Pedro Alcantara Monteclaro, Maragtas. Janiuay: 1854 (translated in English by Esther Abiera, et al., and currently in the Library of the University of Michigan).
 Early historic coastal city-states and polities of Philippines
Pintados
 Indian cultural influences in early Philippine polities
 Greater India
 Indosphere

Notes

References
.

Further reading
.
.
.

External links
  (Visayan),  (English) (Translated to English by Esther Abiera)

Visayan mythology
Filipino nobility
Culture of Iloilo